Overlea is a neighborhood in northeast Baltimore. It is home to the Maryland School for the Blind.

History 
In 1919, part of the community of Overlea in Baltimore County was annexed by the city of Baltimore.

References

Neighborhoods in Baltimore
Northeast Baltimore